The Osbourn Seamount is a seamount in the south-west Pacific Ocean. It is the westernmost and oldest unsubducted seamount of the Louisville Ridge, with an estimated age of 78.8 ± 1.3 .

Osbourn Seamount will eventually be destroyed by subduction in the Tonga and Kermadec trenches once it is carried into the trenches by the ongoing plate motion.  The trench-chain collision zone is moving southward at a rate of / because of the oblique angle between the trench and the Louisville chain.  This further shortens the seamount's lifespan.
The flat top of the seamount is currently tilting down toward the trench because the seamount is sitting on the edge of the trench where the Australian Plate is being bent by subduction.

The Osbourn Seamount is the same age as the Detroit Seamount (75.8±0.6 Ma), one of the oldest of the Hawaii–Emperor seamount chain, and a clockwise bend in the Louisville chain near Osbourn is similar to the Detroit-Meiji bend in the Hawaii–Emperor chain.

References
 Notes

 Sources

 
 
 

Guyots
Seamounts of the Pacific Ocean
Hotspot volcanoes
Cretaceous volcanoes
Polygenetic volcanoes